Direct Hits is the first U.K. compilation album and the fourth U.K. LP released by The Who. It collects singles, B-sides, and album tracks originally recorded for Reaction Records and Track Records between 1966 and 1968. 

Earlier Who recordings from 1965, such as "My Generation", were released in the UK by Brunswick Records and were not available for this release due to music licensing issues. This limitation makes the collection unrepresentative of the breadth of the Who's work up till this point.

Direct Hits shares a few songs with the earlier U.S. compilation album Magic Bus: The Who on Tour, but is otherwise unrelated to that release. It does not include the song Magic Bus, which had reached #26 on the U.K. singles chart during the summer of 1968. Until the early 1980s this was the only album to include Who rarities such as "In the City", "Dogs", and a cover of the Rolling Stones' "The Last Time".

Release history

Original 1968 U.K. LP copies were released in both stereo and mono. The album did not sell as well as other U.K. Who albums and it was deleted in the 1970s. It was released in Czechoslovakia in 1985 with a different artwork titled The Best of The Who. It was also re-issued on vinyl in 1980 in Japan. In 2006 the mono version was made available in the U.S. as a limited edition vinyl re-issue by Classic Records. This release was pressed in regular weight (150 gram) and heavy weight (200 gram) versions. A CD version was released as a limited edition in Japan in 2007, which is one of only a few releases with the original mono single version of "I Can See for Miles" on an authorized CD.

Track listing
All songs written by Pete Townshend except where noted.

Side One
"Bucket T" (Altfield, Christian, Torrence) – 2:08
"I'm a Boy" – 2:36
"Pictures of Lily" – 2:43
"Doctor! Doctor!" (Entwistle) – 2:53
"I Can See for Miles" – 3:55
"Substitute" – 3:47

Side Two
"Happy Jack" – 2:11
"The Last Time" (Mick Jagger, Keith Richards) – 2:50
"In the City" (Entwistle, Moon) - 2:19
"Call Me Lightning" – 2:19
"Mary Anne with the Shaky Hand" – 2:05
"Dogs" – 3:03

References

1968 compilation albums
The Who compilation albums
Track Records compilation albums